Charles Danvers was a songwriter. His best-known piece is "Till" (French title "Prière Sans Espoir"), for which he wrote the music. (The French language lyrics were written by Pierre Buisson, the English language lyrics by Carl Sigman.)

Born to a French colonial family in Algeria, he went to France when Algeria fought its war to become independent in the 1950s. He was awarded a knighthood by the French Academy of Arts. Eventually he moved to Long Island, NY, United States, where he taught music.
 
He loved Spanish music and used the pseudonym Charles Sananes to write some Spanish-influenced music. The name Sananes is sometimes also shown as the writer of "Till."

Danvers
Danvers